George Frederick Payne (28 November 1893 – 21 November 1962) was an Australian rules footballer who played with South Melbourne in the Victorian Football League (VFL).

Notes

External links 

1893 births
1962 deaths
Australian rules footballers from Victoria (Australia)
Australian Rules footballers: place kick exponents
Sydney Swans players